Christopher Brown is an American author, who formerly wrote under the name Chris Nakashima-Brown, and is known for writing science fiction.

His first novel, Tropic of Kansas, was published in 2017 by Harper Voyager, and was a finalist for the 2018 John W. Campbell Memorial Award for Best Science Fiction Novel of the year.

His work frequently focuses on issues at the nexus of technology, politics, economics and ecology. His short fiction and criticism has been published in a variety of anthologies and magazines, including MIT Technology Review’s Twelve Tomorrows, LitHub, Tor.com, Reckoning, and The Baffler.

He was a 2013 World Fantasy Award nominee for the anthology he co-edited, Three Messages and a Warning: Contemporary Mexican Short Stories of the Fantastic.

His novel Rule of Capture, the first in a series of speculative legal thrillers, is scheduled for publication by Harper Voyager in 2019.

Brown lives in Austin, Texas, where he is a member of the Turkey City Writer's Workshop and also practices technology law.

References

External links
 Official website
 Christopher Brown at the Encyclopedia of Science Fiction

American science fiction writers
American short story writers
American male short story writers
Living people
Novelists from Texas
American male novelists
Year of birth missing (living people)
Writers from Austin, Texas